Evergreen, or Evergreen Community, is a neighbourhood in the rural northeast portion of the City of Edmonton, Alberta, Canada. A manufactured home community, it is located at the northwest corner of 167 Avenue NW and Meridian Street.

Evergreen had a population of 1,450 according to Edmonton's 2012 municipal census.

The community is represented by the Edmonton Evergreen Community Association, established in 1982, which runs a community hall located at Evergreen Drive and Cedar Avenue.

Demographics 

Black Friday 

On July 31, 1987, fifteen people in Evergreen were killed and almost 200 homes were destroyed or damaged beyond repair when the Edmonton Tornado swept through the community at the north end of its  path of death and destruction.

Surrounding neighbourhoods

See also 
 Maple Ridge, Edmonton
 Westview Village, Edmonton
 Edmonton Federation of Community Leagues

References

External links 
City of Edmonton neighbourhood profile
Calgary Sun article on the 1987 tornado
Evergreen Community Website

Neighbourhoods in Edmonton